James Robbie Leonard McQuilkin (born 9 January 1989) is an English footballer who plays as a midfielder for Hednesford Town.

Career

Hereford United
McQuilkin was born in Tipton, West Midlands. Having previously been attached to West Bromwich Albion and FC Tescoma Zlín, McQuilkin made his Football League debut for Hereford United in their opening home game of the 2009–10 season against Cheltenham Town. He signed a new one-year contract at the end of the 2009–10 season to keep him at the club. After becoming a regular member of the starting XI in his second season at Edgar Street he signed a new contract to keep him at the club until the end of the 2012–13 season. After finding first team chances limited, he joined Kidderminster Harriers on loan for an initial one-month period in January 2012. He made five appearances for the club, scoring once before returning to Hereford after the end of the month's loan period. He was released by Hereford on 22 March 2013.

Walsall
After leaving Hereford, McQuilkin signed a one-year contract at League One side Walsall on 29 July 2013 following a successful trial spell. Saddlers manager Dean Smith praised McQuilkin, saying: "He has put in some good performances and I have been extremely impressed with his attitude. He is a welcome addition to the squad." He made ten total appearances for the League One club and was released at the end of the season.

Non-league
McQuilkin played for Conference North club Hednesford Town before signing for Conference National side Torquay United in November 2014. The following January, he was praised by manager Chris Hargreaves for continuing to play despite not being paid.

In August 2015, he signed for AFC Telford United in the National League North, for whom he played in one match before playing one game for Hednesford in the same league a month later. On 10 November, he signed for Kidderminster again, now in the National League. Four days later on his first start, he scored in a 2–0 home win against Aldershot Town.

In June 2018, McQuilkin returned to Telford.

In September 2022, McQuilkin returned to Hednesford Town.

Club statistics

References

External links

1989 births
Living people
Sportspeople from Tipton
English expatriate sportspeople in the Czech Republic
English footballers
Association footballers from Northern Ireland
Northern Ireland under-21 international footballers
Association football midfielders
West Bromwich Albion F.C. players
Czech First League players
FC Fastav Zlín players
Hereford United F.C. players
Kidderminster Harriers F.C. players
Walsall F.C. players
Torquay United F.C. players
AFC Telford United players
Hednesford Town F.C. players
Hereford F.C. players
Stourbridge F.C. players
English Football League players
National League (English football) players
Southern Football League players
Expatriate footballers in the Czech Republic
English expatriate footballers